Ivana Catherine Bacik (born 25 May 1968) is an Irish Labour Party politician who has been Leader of the Labour Party since 24 March 2022 and a Teachta Dála (TD) for the Dublin Bay South constituency since winning a by-election on 9 July 2021. Bacik previously served as Leader of the Labour Party in the Seanad from 2011 to 2021, and a Senator for the Dublin University constituency from 2007 to 2021. She previously served as Deputy leader of Seanad Éireann from 2011 to 2016.

Bacik is known in particular for her abortion rights campaigning since the 1980s, and her high media profile.

Personal life
Bacik's paternal grandfather, Charles Bacik, was a Czech factory owner who moved to Ireland in 1946. He eventually settled in Waterford and in 1947 was involved in the establishment of Waterford Crystal. Her mother's side of the family are Murphys from County Clare. Her father was an astronomer and took employment in a number of locations. As a result, she lived in London and South Africa, before moving to Crookstown, County Cork, twenty miles west of Cork City, aged six, when he became a physics lecturer in the Cork Institute of Technology. She attended the nearby national school in Cloughduv. When Bacik was 11 years old, her family moved to the Sunday’s Well area of Cork City. At the age of 14, she moved to Dublin.

She won a scholarship to board at Alexandra College in Milltown, Dublin. She lives with husband Alan Saul and their two daughters in Portobello, Dublin.

University politics
Bacik resigned as president of Trinity College Dublin Students' Union in 1990, after breaking the mandate from the Union membership regarding voting for candidates at a Union of Students in Ireland conference. Despite 13 TCD representatives being mandated to vote for one candidate, Martin Whelan, a former TCD SU president, it transpired that he received only 12 votes, Bacik's vote instead being given to the feminist former UCD SU officer, Karen Quinlivan. A controversy erupted in the Students' Union and a subsequent internal investigation led to Bacik's resignation.

She was taken to court by the anti-abortion group, the Society for the Protection of the Unborn Child (SPUC), for providing information on abortion. SPUC were successful in the court case, although that success came in the 1990s, long after Bacik had graduated from Trinity College. A High Court injunction had been ordered against Bacik and other members of the TCD Students' Union in October 1989. In November 1989, Bacik was informed by the Gardaí that the Union of Students in Ireland (USI) and the TCD Students' Union were under investigation following complaints that "they were corrupting the public morals by disseminating information on abortion." In an article she wrote for the International Planned Parenthood Federation, she said it was soon-to-be Irish President Mary Robinson that prevented her and students' union members from going to prison.

Political career and campaigns
Bacik contested the Seanad Éireann elections in 1997 and 2002 as an Independent candidate in the Dublin University constituency, but was not successful in these outings.

She ran as a Labour Party candidate at the 2004 election to the European Parliament in the Dublin constituency. She ran with sitting MEP Proinsias De Rossa, who was also the party president, on the same ticket. She polled 40,707 first preference votes (9.6%) but was not elected.

In 2004, her book Kicking and Screaming: Dragging Ireland into the 21st Century, was published by O’Brien Press.

In 2007, she contested the Seanad Éireann elections for the third time in the Dublin University constituency, and was elected to the third seat, behind sitting Independent senators Shane Ross and David Norris. She initially sat as an Independent senator.

In February 2009, Bacik was included in an 'All Star Women's Cabinet' in the Irish Independent. In March 2009, Bacik confirmed claims made on a TV programme that she had taken two voluntary paycuts of 10% in addition to a pension levy. In June 2009, Bacik was the Labour Party candidate for the Dublin Central by-election she came in third with 17% of the first preference votes. She joined the Labour Party group in the Seanad in September 2009, and became Labour Party Seanad spokesperson for both Justice and Arts, Sports and Tourism. In November 2009, a feature by Mary Kenny of the Irish Independent included Bacik in a list of women who "well deserved their iconic status."

In May 2010, she sought Labour's nomination to contest the next election in the Dublin South-East constituency but was not selected. In December 2010, she was added to the ticket as the second candidate beside Labour Party leader, Eamon Gilmore, in the Dún Laoghaire constituency for the 2011 general election. Gilmore topped the poll, with Bacik receiving 10.1% of first preference votes but she was not elected. She was re-elected to Seanad Éireann at the subsequent election, after which she became Deputy Leader of the Seanad. She held her seat in the Seanad in 2016 and in 2020.

On 27 April 2021, after the resignation of Eoghan Murphy from his Dáil seat in Dublin Bay South, Bacik announced her intention to stand in the upcoming by-election. She campaigned with an emphasis on providing affordable housing, as well as improving healthcare and childcare, tackling climate change, and achieving "a true republic in which church and state are separated". During the campaign, she described herself as having "more bills passed into law than any other Senator, on issues such as workers' conditions, women's health rights, and LGBT equality". Bacik also campaigned on increasing the number of sports amenities for children in the area, calling for unused Defence Forces football fields at the Cathal Brugha Barracks to be freed up for local sports, with the suggestion rejected by Fine Gael Minister for Defence Simon Coveney. Fine Gael complained to RTÉ after she featured prominently on National Treasures, a prime-time TV show broadcast by RTÉ during the campaign. RTÉ has strict rules about fair coverage of candidates during campaigns. The national broadcaster blamed an "inadvertent error" for the programme being shown three days before the election. A steering group within the broadcaster told Fine Gael that "the broadcast should not have happened." Consequentially, RTÉ had to show a special report on the by-election on Prime Time to "ensure fair coverage is given to all candidates".

Bacik won this election, receiving 8,131 (30.2%) first preference votes. It was her fourth attempt as a Labour candidate, and she expressed her delight at the success at the count centre in the RDS. Following the election, she was described by the Irish Times as "a formidable activist and public intellectual" and that Fine Gael's perceived antipathy towards their former TD, Kate O'Connell, may have contributed to the surge in support to Bacik from women voters. The newspaper claimed that her election was "a long overdue morale boost" for Labour.

In August 2021, Bacik apologised for attending Katherine Zappone's controversial party in the Merrion Hotel, Dublin, in July of that year. She stated that she believed that it took place within existing COVID-19 pandemic restrictions.

In March 2022, she confirmed she would run to succeed Alan Kelly as Labour Party leader. Kelly stated that he believed that Bacik would succeed him. On 24 March 2022 she was confirmed as Labour Party leader unopposed at a party conference in Dublin. In a speech she said she would focus on the rising cost of living and the serious and global problems facing the country. Bacik pledged that Labour would fight the next election as a "standalone party" rather than joining any left-wing alliance.

Political views 
Bacik's policies have been described as liberal and social democratic; In 2004 she was described as "Labour's queen of political correctness" in an Irish Independent opinion piece. 

Since 2007 Bacik has spoken in support of the legalisation of cannabis.

In September 2006, Bacik was one of the 61 Irish academic signatories of a letter published in The Irish Times calling for an academic boycott of the state of Israel.
In January 2009, she declared that she wants Ireland to break off diplomatic relations with Israel and in February 2009 called for a general boycott of Israeli goods.

In May 2019, following the results of the Mother and Baby Homes Commission of Investigation which found that hundreds of children had died while in the care of homes run by the Catholic Church, Bacik called for the government to take financial action against the religious orders involved.

In 2020, she sponsored legislation in the Seanad to grant Irish citizenship to any child born on the island of Ireland, which resulted in the Irish citizenship laws being changed in March 2021.

In December 2020, she called for foreign frontline medical workers fighting against the COVID-19 pandemic in Ireland to be rewarded with fast-tracked citizenship applications, as has been done in France.

In 2022 Bacik called for a pay rise for workers and a windfall tax on energy companies, and an increase in the minimum wage.

Legal work
In 2006, Bacik acted as junior counsel in Zappone v. Revenue Commissioners, the unsuccessful High Court case brought by Katherine Zappone and Ann Louise Gilligan over the non-recognition of their Canadian same-sex marriage by the Revenue Commissioners.

She has an LL.B. from TCD and an LL.M. from the London School of Economics. She practises as a barrister and taught courses in criminal law; criminology and penology; and feminist theory and law at Trinity. She was Reid Professor of Criminal Law, Criminology and Penology at Trinity College Dublin (TCD) Law School from 1996 to 2022, and was a made a Fellow of Trinity College Dublin in 2005. Her research interests include criminal law and criminology, constitutional law, feminist theories and law, human rights and equality issues in law.

Awards
In 2019, Bacik was chosen by the Irish Women Lawyers Association as Irish Woman Lawyer of the Year. In 2019, she was selected as Irish Tatler's 'Woman of the Year.'

References

External links

Ivana Bacik's page on Labour Party website

resent

1968 births
Living people
20th-century Irish lawyers
Alumni of Trinity College Dublin
Alumni of the London School of Economics
Fellows of Trinity College Dublin
Independent members of Seanad Éireann
Irish legal scholars
Irish people of Czech descent
Irish abortion-rights activists
Irish women's rights activists
Labour Party (Ireland) senators
Irish LGBT rights activists
Irish women activists
Members of the 23rd Seanad
Members of the 24th Seanad
Members of the 25th Seanad
Members of the 26th Seanad
21st-century women members of Seanad Éireann
People educated at Alexandra College
Scholars of criminal law
Members of Seanad Éireann for Dublin University
Women legal scholars
Women civil rights activists
21st-century women Teachtaí Dála
Labour Party (Ireland) TDs
Members of the 33rd Dáil
Leaders of the Labour Party (Ireland)